Jak Ali Harvey, formerly Jacques Montgomery Harvey (born 4 May 1989 in Hanover Parish, Jamaica) is a former Jamaican sprinter. He now competes for Turkey.

Harvey won the silver medal of the 100 m event at the 2016 European Athletics Championships in Amsterdam, Netherlands. He became the first ever Turkish athlete to win a medal in that event at the European Championships.

Competition record

1Disqualified in the final

References

External links
World Athletics Bio

1989 births
Living people
Jamaican male sprinters
Jamaican emigrants to Turkey
Naturalized citizens of Turkey
Turkish male sprinters
World Athletics Championships athletes for Turkey
European Athletics Championships medalists
Athletes (track and field) at the 2016 Summer Olympics
Athletes (track and field) at the 2020 Summer Olympics
Olympic athletes of Turkey
Universiade medalists in athletics (track and field)
Athletes (track and field) at the 2018 Mediterranean Games
Athletes (track and field) at the 2022 Mediterranean Games
Mediterranean Games gold medalists for Turkey
Mediterranean Games medalists in athletics
Universiade gold medalists for Jamaica
People from Hanover Parish
Athletes (track and field) at the 2019 European Games
European Games medalists in athletics
European Games bronze medalists for Turkey
Mediterranean Games gold medalists in athletics
Medalists at the 2011 Summer Universiade
Olympic male sprinters